Oosterflank is a station on Rotterdam Metro lines A and B, and is situated in the northeastern part of Rotterdam, in Prins Alexander borough. The station serves the Oosterflank neighbourhood, situated just east of the station.

This station was opened on 28 May 1983 when the East-West Line (also formerly the Caland line) was extended from its previous terminus Capelsebrug and is on a section that uses overhead wires to provide traction power.

There is interchange with RET-buslines 36 and 37.

Rotterdam Metro stations
Railway stations opened in 1983
1983 establishments in the Netherlands
Railway stations in the Netherlands opened in the 20th century